Park Grove is a suburban locality in the local government area (LGA) of Burnie in the North-west and west LGA region of Tasmania. The 2016 census has a population of 2385 for the state suburb of Park Grove.
Mainly a residential area, the suburb is located close to education facilities.
The suburb has an IGA X-press, cafe and garden centre are among businesses that operate with the suburb.

History 
Park Grove was gazetted as a locality in 1974.

Geography
Cooee Creek forms most of the western boundary.

Road infrastructure 
The C108 route (West Mooreville Road / Mooreville Road / West Park Grove) passes through from south-west to north-east.

Education 
Burnie Primary School
Stella Maris Catholic Primary School Est. 1908 present site 1977
Maddington Child Services
Footprints Educational Complex
University of Tasmania – Cradle Coast Campus Est. 1995

Churches 
Burnie Seventh-day Adventist Church
Martin Luther Lutheran Church Burnie

Sport 
The Burnie Tennis Centre and Burnie Tennis Club have hosted the Burnie International since 2003. Burnie Tennis Club competes in the Burnie Tennis League.

References

External links 
Burnie Primary School
Stella Maris Catholic Primary School
Burnie International

Suburbs of Burnie, Tasmania
Towns in Tasmania